The 2014–15 Arizona State Sun Devils women's basketball team represented Arizona State University during the 2014–15 NCAA Division I women's basketball season. The Sun Devils, led by eighteenth year head coach Charli Turner Thorne, played their games at the Wells Fargo Arena and were members of the Pac-12 Conference. They finished the season 29–5, 15–3 in Pac-12 play to finish in second place. They advanced to the semifinals of the Pac-12 women's tournament where they lost to Stanford. They received at-large bid of the NCAA women's tournament where they defeated Ohio in the first round, Arkansas–Little Rock in the second round before getting defeated by Florida State in the sweet sixteen to end their season.

Roster

Rankings

Schedule

|-
!colspan=9 style="background:#990033; color:#FFB310;"| Non-conference regular season

|-
!colspan=9 style="background:#990033; color:#FFB310;"| Pac-12 regular season

|-
!colspan=9 style="background:#990033;"| Pac-12 Women's Tournament

|-
!colspan=9 style="background:#990033;"| NCAA Women's Tournament

See also
 2014–15 Arizona State Sun Devils men's basketball team

References

Arizona State Sun Devils women's basketball seasons
Arizona
Arizonia
Arizonia